Trazendo a Arca is a Christian band from Nova Iguaçu, Rio de Janeiro, Brazil.

Biography 
The group was formed in 2002 in the Church Ministério Apascentar. In 2003 they released the album entitled Restitution, which sold over a million copies, becoming the fourth CD of gospel music's best-selling Brazil. They sold about five million albums, participated in the Talent Trophy between 2005 and 2009. They released twelve albums, and four records on DVD. In 2007, the group split from the Church and the group's initial name "Toque no Altar" was variously called the current name. In September 2007 released an album recorded live in Japan, in 2008, recorded a DVD in Rio de Janeiro, and all food collected by the group were sent to poor municipalities in the state of Minas Gerais.

In 2011 they recorded their first DVD in the United States at Orlando, Florida, and was attended by three thousand people.

Discography

Studio albums

Live albums

Video albums

Compilations
2012: Trazendo a Arca Deluxe Collection

References

External links
Official Website

Brazilian gospel musical groups
Musical groups established in 2002
2002 establishments in Brazil